Da Boom Crew is an animated television series created by Bruce W. Smith, John Patrick White, and Stiles White. The series premiered on The WB as part of the Kids' WB! schedule in September 2004. Unusual for an animated series, it was pulled from the Kids' WB! line-up after only four episodes had aired.

Plot
Four foster kids create a video game about heroes going up against space alien terrorists. Then a portal appears and pulls them into a dimension which is really similar to their game. This show also details their adventures in this parallel world, as they embark on a quest to find their missing video game cartridges and stop the sadistic  extraterrestrial emperor Zorch from taking control of this intergalactic dimension.

Characters
 Justin – The leader and general of the crew who wears shoulder pads, & elbow pads. His weapons are two laser pistols and an arm slingshot.
 Nate –   The gang's ship pilot, Justin's younger brother, and his right hand man. The shortest and youngest in the group, he has short brown hair and wears a light blue top and blue jeans. He refers to himself as 'big daddy Nate' and has a fear of heights. His arsenal is a laser sword given to him as a reward by the yo-diggians for helping save commander Blurp.
 Jubei – A hoverboard rider. He's Justin's friend who wears a visor cap armed with a laser shotgun, and is an accurate sharp shooter. However, when he misses a shot, he calls it the "kiki popo". He is apparently of Japanese descent.
 Ricki – A whiz kid gadget creator, making her the gang's genius. She is a ginger-haired girl who wears a red track jacket with matching jogging pants, grey hiking boots, a blue wristband on her left wrist, and has ginger hair up positioned in 2 pigtails. She is an expert with anything mechanical, uses a vast scientific knowledge when describing things, attacks using a metal staff, has a fear of water, and even romantic feelings for her superior Justin.
 Dent – A sentient robot which has been given to Ricki as a gift after she helped save commander Blurp. He resembles a flat screen computer with a hollow, metal, cylindrical body, has two robotic arms and moves around on a small set of wheels. He does not talk, but shows above-average human intelligence and uses a series of beeps to communicate. A digital face portraying his mood is shown on the screen.
 "Great Commander" Blurp – Former War Commander of Yo-diggity in the war against Zorch. He says he is a brave commander, but his actions say otherwise.
 Zorch – He wishes to conquer the galaxy by gathering the Boom Cards. This character was voiced by Morris Day.
 Headlock – Cohort of Zorch. He wears a dome on his head because it is abnormally small. His assistant's name is Gerone.
 Hetra – Headlock's evil older sister. She and Commander Blurp were trained by the same mentor.

Episodes

Production
The series was produced by Berliner Film Company, in association with Jambalaya Studios in Los Angeles, California. Unusual for an animated series targeted at children, Da Boom Crew was pulled from the Kids' WB! line-up and cancelled after only four episodes due to low ratings and negative viewer reception.

Animation Magazine had reported that a second season was in production. However, following the show's cancellation, the second season was never produced.

Broadcast and release
The series premiered on The WB as part of the Kids' WB! schedule in September 2004. In the United Kingdom, all 13 episodes were broadcast on Cartoon Network UK in 2005.

The entire series is streaming on Tubi TV in the United States, as well as Amazon Prime Video with the Ameba addon.

References

External links
 

Kids' WB original shows
2000s American animated television series
2000s American animated comedy television series
2000s American comic science fiction television series
2000s American black cartoons
2004 American television series debuts
2005 American television series endings
2000s Canadian animated television series
2000s Canadian animated comedy television series
2000s Canadian comic science fiction television series
2000s Canadian black cartoons
2004 Canadian television series debuts
2005 Canadian television series endings
American children's animated action television series
American children's animated adventure television series
American children's animated comic science fiction television series
Canadian children's animated action television series
Canadian children's animated adventure television series
Canadian children's animated comic science fiction television series
Animated television series about orphans
Television series by Hyperion Pictures
Unaired television episodes
English-language television shows
Television series about parallel universes
Television shows about video games
Television series created by Bruce W. Smith
Television series created by Stiles White